This is a list of the rulers of the Kingdom of Gwynedd.

Many of them were also acclaimed "King of the Britons" or "Prince of Wales".

List of Kings or Princes of Gwynedd

House of Cunedda
 Cunedda Wledig ap Edern (Cunedda the Imperator) (c. 450–c. 460)
 Einion Yrth ap Cunedda (Einion the Impetuous) (c. 470–c. 480)
 Owain Ddantgwyn (Owain Whitetooth) ap Einion (Rhos; late 5th century)
 Cynlas Goch (Rhos) & St Einion (Llŷn) ap Owain (late 5th and early 6th centuries)
 Cadwallon Lawhir ap Einion (Cadwallon Long Hand) (c. 500–c. 534)
 Maelgwn Hir ap Cadwallon (Maelgwn Gwynedd) (c. 520–c. 547)
 Rhun Hir ap Maelgwn (Rhun the Tall) (c. 547–c. 580)
 Beli ap Rhun (c. 580–c. 599)
 Iago ap Beli (c. 599–c. 616)
 Cadfan ap Iago (c. 613–c. 625)
 Cadwallon ap Cadfan (c. 625–634)
 Cadafael Cadomedd ap Cynfeddw (Cadfael the Battle-Shirker) (634–c. 655)
 Cadwaladr Fendigaid ap Cadwallon (Cadwallader the Blessed) (c. 655–c. 682)
 Idwal Iwrch ap Cadwaladr (Idwal Roebuck) (c. 682–c. 720)
 Rhodri Molwynog ap Idwal (Rhodri the Bald and Grey) (c. 720–c. 754)
 Caradog ap Meirion (c. 754–c. 798)
 Cynan Dindaethwy ap Rhodri (c. 798–816)
 Hywel ap Rhodri Molwynog (814–825)

With Hywel's death, all male descendants of Maelgwn Gwynedd have expired. Merfyn the Freckled succeeds through his mother Esyllt, eldest daughter of Cynan Dindaethwy and niece of Hywel ap Rhodri Molwynog.

House of Manaw
 Merfyn Frych (Merfyn the Freckled) ap Gwriad (825–844)
 Rhodri Mawr (Rhodri the Great) ap Merfyn (844–878)

House of Aberffraw
The warfare among the sons of Rhodri meant that the descendants of Anarawd became considered a separate house  called the House of Aberffraw from their principal seat  from the junior branches in Deheubarth and elsewhere.

 Anarawd ap Rhodri (878–916) (establishes the Aberffraw dynasty, the senior branch of descendants from Rhodri Mawr)
 Idwal Foel ab Anarawd (Idwal the Bald) (916–942)
 Hywel Dda ap Cadell (Howell the Good) (942–950) (Dinefwr dynasty, descended from the second son of Rhodri Mawr who ruled in Deheubarth, usurps Gwynedd from the Aberffraw line.)
 Iago ab Idwal (950–979) (returns to the Aberffraw branch)
 Ieuaf ab Idwal (950–969)
 Hywel ab Ieuaf (974–985)
 Cadwallon ab Ieuaf (985–986)

House of Dinefwr
 Maredudd ab Owain (986–999) Dinefwr dynasty seizes Gwynedd

House of Aberffraw
 Cynan ap Hywel (999–1005) Returns to the Aberffraw dynasty briefly

Usurper
 Aeddan ap Blegywryd (1005–1018) (minor commote lord usurps Gwynedd from the Aberffraw dynasty)

House of Rhuddlan
 Llywelyn ap Seisyll (1018–1023) (Rhuddlan dynasty in lower Gwynedd usurps from Aeddan ap Blegywryd)

House of Aberffraw
 Iago ab Idwal ap Meurig (1023–1039) (Aberffraw dynasty returns)

House of Rhuddlan
 Gruffydd ap Llywelyn (1039–1063) (Llywelyn's son Gruffydd usurps from Aberffraw dynasty)

House of Mathrafal
Bleddyn ap Cynfyn (1063–1075) and Rhiwallon ap Cynfyn (1063-1070) [co-rulers] (Mathrafal dynasty of Powys "receives" Gwynedd from the English King)
 Trahaearn ap Caradog (1075–1081)

House of Aberffraw
 Gruffydd ap Cynan (1081–1137) (Aberffraw dynasty returns)
 Owain Gwynedd ap Gruffydd (1137–1170) 
 Hywel ab Owain Gwynedd r. 1170; killed by his younger brother Dafydd ab Owain in a conspiracy hatched by his stepmother Cristen, dowager princess of Gwynedd, and her sons Dafydd and Rhodri ab Owain.
 Dafydd I the Usurper (1170–1195), displaced elder brother Hywel ap Owain Gwynedd, but was himself displaced from Upper Gwynedd c.1173 ruling only lower Gwynedd until displaced by Llywelyn Fawr in 1198. England recognized Dafydd as Prince of Gwynedd, though Welsh jurists did not.
 Rhodri ab Owain Gwynedd (1175–1194, 1194-1195) Ruling upper Gwynedd and Ynys Mon until 1194 and then Ynys Mon solely from 1194-1195 until he was ousted by the sons of his brother Cynan. 
 Maelgwn ab Owain Gwynedd (1170–1173), ruling Ynys Mon and supporter of his elder brother Hywel ap Owain's claim as Prince. After Hywel's death, Maelgwn was able to retain Ynys Mon from Dafydd the Usurper.

Princes of Wales
 Llywelyn Fawr (Llywelyn the Great) ap Iorwerth (1195–1240), first Prince of Wales
 Dafydd ap Llywelyn (1240–1246)
 Owain Goch (Owain the Red) ap Gruffydd (1246–1255)
 Llywelyn the Last ap Gruffydd (1246–1282)
 Dafydd ap Gruffydd (1282–1283), pretender

Pretenders
 Madog ap Llywelyn (1294–1295) (not crowned but claimed the title)
 Owain Lawgoch (Owain Redhand) ap Tomas ap Rhodri (1372–1378), great-nephew of Llywelyn ap Gruffudd, in exile but claimed the title.

See also
 List of Princes of Wales

References

 01
List
Kingdom of Gwynedd
People from Gwynedd
Gwynedd Rulers
Gwynedd Rulers
Gwynedd Rulers